Leandro Guaita (born 19 May 1986) is an Argentine professional footballer who plays as a winger in Italy for Serie D club Lavello.

Club career
Born in La Plata, Guaita started his career with local club Estudiantes in 2003. He transferred to Swiss football club FC Basel in 2004 and moved to Serie B side Vicenza Calcio in 2005. However, Guaita did not establish himself in the club and played for some lower-level clubs in Italy between 2006 and 2010, such as S.S.D. Sapri Calcio, U.S.D. Nuorese Calcio, Polisportiva Alghero, San Marino Calcio, U.S. Poggibonsi and A.S.D. Virtus Casarano.

In the summer of 2011, Guaita signed a contract with Ecuadorian Serie A side Independiente José Terán. He made 18 league appearances in the Second stage of the season, scoring one goal, helping the club avoid relegation. Guaita moved to 3. Liga club SV Wehen Wiesbaden in January 2012. He made his debut on 24 January in a 1–1 draw against SV Werder Bremen II, coming on as a substitute for Jonne Hjelm in the 69th minute. Guaita played only one match for the first team and one game for the second team in the Hessenliga. On 20 March, Guaita had his contract terminated by mutual consent.

On 12 July 2012, Guaita signed a half-year deal with China League One side Shenzhen Ruby by manager Philippe Troussier. He made his League One debut on 21 July in a 1–0 home win against Tianjin Songjiang, coming on as a substitute for Takashi Rakuyama by the end of the match. Mainly used as a substitute by Shenzhen Ruby, Guaita made 11 appearances in 2012 season and scored a goal. He was released by Shenzhen at the end of the season.

On 20 July 2019, he joined Taranto in Serie D.

Notes

References

External links

1986 births
Living people
Argentine footballers
Association football midfielders
Footballers from La Plata
3. Liga players
Serie C players
Serie D players
Estudiantes de La Plata footballers
FC Basel players
L.R. Vicenza players
Nuorese Calcio players
Pol. Alghero players
A.S.D. Victor San Marino players
U.S. Poggibonsi players
C.S.D. Independiente del Valle footballers
SV Wehen Wiesbaden players
Shenzhen F.C. players
Potenza Calcio players
Arzachena Academy Costa Smeralda players
Taranto F.C. 1927 players
China League One players
Argentine expatriate footballers
Argentine expatriate sportspeople in Switzerland
Expatriate footballers in Switzerland
Argentine expatriate sportspeople in Italy
Expatriate footballers in Italy
Argentine expatriate sportspeople in Ecuador
Expatriate footballers in Ecuador
Argentine expatriate sportspeople in Germany
Expatriate footballers in Germany
Argentine expatriate sportspeople in China
Expatriate footballers in China